Edward Noel, 1st Earl of Gainsborough, 4th Viscount Campden (1641 – January 1689) was a British peer, styled Hon. Edward Noel from 1660 to 1681.

Origins
Edward Noel was born in 1641, the son and heir of Baptist Noel, 3rd Viscount Campden.

Career
Noel represented Rutland in the House of Commons of England from 1661 to 1679. He was appointed a deputy lieutenant of Rutland in March 1670. In 1676, he was appointed Lord Lieutenant of Hampshire in February, and Warden and Keeper of the New Forest in March.

After being appointed Colonel of the Hampshire Militia in 1678, he was briefly knight of the shire for Hampshire in 1679. On 3 February 1681, he was created Baron Noel and entered the House of Lords, and was appointed Custos Rotulorum of Hampshire. In 1682, he was given several local offices in Hampshire: Governor of Portsmouth, Constable of Porchester Castle, and Lieutenant of South Bere Forest. He succeeded his father in October as Viscount Campden and as Lord Lieutenant and Custos Rotulorum of Rutland, and was further honoured at the end of the year when he was created Earl of Gainsborough on 1 December 1682.

Between December 1687 and January 1688, during the purge of James II, he was dismissed from all his Hampshire offices in favour of the Duke of Berwick, although he was commissioned a captain in the Queen Dowager's Regiment of Foot in 1687. He was also replaced by Earl of Peterborough as Lord Lieutenant of Rutland at this time.

On 25 March 1688, he was reappointed Warden and Keeper of the New Forest and the Park of Lyndhurst.

Marriages and issue
He married twice:

Firstly to Lady Elizabeth Wriothesley, the eldest of the three daughters and co-heiresses of Thomas Wriothesley, 4th Earl of Southampton (by his first wife), by whom he had five children:
Wriothesley Baptist Noel, 2nd Earl of Gainsborough (d. 1690), son and heir;
Lady Frances Noel (d. 1684), who married Simon Digby, 4th Baron Digby
Lady Jane Noel, who married William Digby, 5th Baron Digby
Lady Elizabeth Noel, who married Richard Norton (d.1732);
Lady Juliana Noel, who died unmarried
Secondly he married Mary Herbert, widow of Sir Robert Worsley, 3rd Baronet and daughter of James Herbert. Without issue.

Death and succession
He died in January 1689 and was succeeded by his son Wriothesley Baptist Noel, 2nd Earl of Gainsborough.

References

|-

1641 births
1689 deaths
Earls of Gainsborough (1682 creation)
Lord-Lieutenants of Hampshire
Lord-Lieutenants of Rutland
Edward
English MPs 1661–1679
English MPs 1679